Charming Boys (French: Charmants Garçons) is a 1957 French musical comedy film directed by Henri Decoin and starring Zizi Jeanmaire, Daniel Gélin and Henri Vidal. It was one of two Hollywood-style musicals made by Decoin around this time along with Folies-Bergère.

It was shot at the Billancourt Studios in Paris. The film's sets were designed by the art director Robert Clavel. It was made using Technicolor.

Synopsis
Lulu, a nightclub entertainer, has many male admirers who all turn out to be completely unreliable.

Cast
 Zizi Jeanmaire as Lulu Natier
 Daniel Gélin as Alain Cartier
 Henri Vidal as Jo, dit Kid Chabanne - le boxeur
 François Périer as 	Robert
 Gert Fröbe as Edmond Petersen 
 Marie Daëms as Germaine
 Renaud Mary as Henri 
 Anne Carrère as Lili
 Albert Médina as Le client volé au palace palace
 René Alié as Le policier au théâtre
 Marius David as Le maître d'hôtel du relais
 André Chanu as Le speaker		
 Jacques Morlaine as Un inspecteur
 Jacques Dhéry  as Un agent 
 Jean Degrave as Le célibataire
 Madeleine Suffel a sAlice - l'habilleuse
 Yves Barsacq as Le détective de l'hôtel
 Jean Lara as Le célibataire
 Pierre Mirat as Un brigadier
 Alain Nobis as Le commissaire à Cannes
 Jean-Pierre Marielle as 	Le chef de la réception à l'hôtel de Deauville 
 Madeleine Lambert as Madame Micoulin
 Jacques Berthier as André Noblet
 Gil Vidal as Max, le gigolo
 Jacques Dacqmine as Charles

 References 

 Bibliography 
Oscherwitz, Dayna & Higgins, Maryellen. The A to Z of French Cinema''. Scarecrow Press, 2009.

External links 
 

1957 films
1957 musical comedy films
French musical comedy films
1950s French-language films
Films directed by Henri Decoin
Films shot at Billancourt Studios
1950s French films